The Billboard Most-Played Folk Records of 1947 is a year-end chart compiled Billboard magazine ranking the year's top folk records based on the number of times the record was played on the nation's juke boxes. In 1947, country music records were included on, and dominated, the Billboard folk records chart.

"Smoke! Smoke! Smoke! (That Cigarette)" by the Tex Williams Western Caravan was the No. 1 folk record of 1947, receiving 103 points on the juke box chart. "It's a Sin" by Eddy Arnold and His Texas Playboys was the No 2 record with 96 points, and "So Round, So Firm, So Fully Packed by Merle Travis ranked third with 91 points.

Three variations on the Cajun classic "Jole Blon" also appeared on the year-end folk chart: "New Jolie Blonde" by Red Foley (No. 7); "New Pretty Blonde" by Moon Mullican (no. 9); and "(Our Own) Jole Blon" by Roy Acuff (No. 15).

Eddy Arnold led all artists with four records on the year-end folk chart, including three of the top five records. Red Foley, Merle Travis, Ernest Tubb, and Tex Williams each had two records included on the year-end chart. 

The top records were evenly distributed among the major labels with four records apiece for Capitol (including Capitol Americana), Columbia, Decca, and RCA Victor.

See also
Billboard year-end top singles of 1947
1947 in country music

Notes

References

1947 record charts
Billboard charts